The 30th Division is a Syrian Division of the Republican Guard established in 2017.

History 
The 30th Division was established in January 2017, following the Syrian Government’s regain of Aleppo city. The Republican Guard created the new Division to incorporate all its units in Aleppo under a single nominal command, and to integrate the paramilitary militias in the city (already operating under the Republican Guard supervision) into the Republican Guard organization.

The then-deputy commander of the Republican Guard and overall military commander of the 2016 Aleppo offensive, Major General Ziad Ali Salah, was appointed in charge of the 30th Division until November 2017 with Major General Zeid as his deputy. In November 2017 Brigadier General Malik Alia took over the command.

Organization 
Gregory Waters acknowledged the difficulty to determine the exact structure of the 30th Division. According to Gregory Waters, it appears to operate three special forces regiments and three brigades: 

 18th Mechanized Brigade, formerly part of the 10th Mechanised Division, was assigned to the 30th Division by 2018;
 123rd Brigade (629th Battalion);
 124th Brigade (872nd Battalion);
 47th Regiment, formerly part of the Special Forces;
 83rd Battalion, formerly part of the Special Forces;
 147th Regiment, formerly part of the Special Forces.

According Kheder Khaddour, the 30th Division functions as an umbrella organization for Aleppo’s local militias while retaining independent operating structures.

See also 
 Syrian Civil War
 Republican Guard (Syria)

Notes 

Divisions of Syria
Military units and formations established in 2017